
Year 57 BC was a year of the pre-Julian Roman calendar. Contemporaneously, in the Roman Republic, it was known as the Year of the Consulship of Lentulus and Metellus (or, less frequently, year 697 Ab urbe condita). The denomination 57 BC for this year has been used since the early medieval period, when the Anno Domini calendar era became the prevalent method in Europe for naming years.

Events 
 By place 

 Roman Republic 
 Consuls: Publius Cornelius Lentulus Spinther and Quintus Caecilius Metellus Nepos.
 Second year of Julius Caesar's Gallic Wars:
 Spring – Julius Caesar raises a further two legions (Legio XIII and Legio XIV), bringing his army in Gaul to eight legions (at which strength it remains until 54 BC).
 Caesar sends Servius Sulpicius Galba with Legio XII into the territory of the Nantuates, Seduni and the Veragri. He occupies Octodurus (modern-day Martigny) in Switzerland.
 Caesar defeats a Belgic army near Bibrax (modern-day Laon) in the territory of the Remi. He moves northwards against the Belgic tribes, the Nervii and the Aduatuci.
 May – Battle of the Axona: Caesar defeats the forces of the Belgae under King Galba of the Suessiones.
 July – Battle of the Sabis: Caesar defeats the Nervii, Roman forces are almost annihilated in an ambush.
 September – The siege and capture of Aduatuca (modern-day Tongeren) by Caesar.

 Parthia 
 Mithridates IV becomes king of Parthia.

 Asia 
 King Vikramaditya establishes the Vikram era.
 Bak Hyeokgeose becomes the first ruler of the kingdom of Silla (traditional date).
 The city of Gwangju (the sixth largest city in South Korea) is founded.

Births

Deaths 
 Boduognatus, leader of the Nervii
 Cleopatra VI, queen of Egypt
 Phraates III, king of Parthia

References